Detre Bell (born 8 March 1997) is a Bermudian international football goalkeeper for North Village Rams. He formerly played college soccer for the Louisville Cardinals.

Career
Bell played college soccer for UConn, Cal State Bakersfield, and Louisville. He transferred to Louisville in December 2020.

He debuted for North Village Rams in 2022.

He made his international debut for Bermuda in 2015. At the youth level he played in the 2017 CONCACAF U-20 Championship.

References

External links
 Louisville Cardinals bio
 Cal State Bakersfield Roadrunners bio

1997 births
Living people
Bermudian footballers
Bermuda international footballers
Bermuda under-20 international footballers
Association football goalkeepers
Cal State Bakersfield Roadrunners men's soccer players
Bermudian expatriate footballers
Bermudian expatriate sportspeople in the United States
Expatriate soccer players in the United States
South Kent School alumni
Louisville Cardinals men's soccer players
UConn Huskies men's soccer players